Brekilen Bay is an indentation in the ice shelf about  southwest of Tangekilen Bay, along the coast of Queen Maud Land. It was mapped by Norwegian cartographers from air photos taken by the Lars Christensen Expedition, 1936–37, and named "Brekilen" (the "glacier bay").

References 

Bays of Queen Maud Land
Princess Ragnhild Coast